Germi (also Romanized as Germī and Germī; also known as Germi Ojarood) is a city in the Central District of Germi County, Ardabil province, Iran, and serves as the capital of the county. At the 2006 census, its population was 28,348 in 6,382 households. The following census in 2011 counted 28,953 people in 7,491 households. The latest census in 2016 showed a population of 28,967 people in 8,375 households.

Germi is one of the old cities of Ardabil province and a part of the Mughan plain. The city is built on the source of the Germi Chai or Ojarud River, so that three rivers join in the middle of the city to form the Ojarud or Germi Chai.

Etymology
When it comes to the etymology of "Germi" it seems somehow cryptic and there are several hypotheses about the meaning of word "Germi" and historical stem of this city Name.
Many historians believe the word "Germi" has Parthian or Alanian stems. Many others suggest ritual words stem from religions such as Mithraism.
There is 2 theory that believe Germi is combination of 2 words: "Ger" and "mi" but the interpretation is different: One group believe on Sumerian stem that "Ger" means village and "Mi" means celestial; the others believe "Ger" comes from "Ager" in old Persian language that changed to "Akhgar" at new Persian language, whereas "mi" comes from "mehr" or "Mitra" which both means: "Sun", so "germi" means fireplace of sun. This interpretation is more consistent with other documents and pieces of evidence about this region and its history.  First Hypothesis believes. The name Germi probably comes from the Parthian name. The other Hypothesis link this word to Maghoi.There are some other places and cities in East-Azerbaijan province, West-Azerbaijan province, Ardabil province and Azerbaijan republic that are called Germi.

History
Germi became the center of the county in 1355 with the separation of Moghan city from Meshginshahr county. Then in 1373, the two cities of Bilesvar and Parsabad were separated from it and became an independent city.

The discovered vestiges indicate that the city is very old and its antiquity dates back to the Parthian period.
Germi county is a historical region of Iranian Azerbaijandespite Germi city is considered a new city based on Iranian standards, which was established almost in the year 900 of the Islamic calendar (900 AH; 1494 A.D.) when Shah Ismail allowed to 5 Shia families to migrate to this region. 
The first documentary about this region which is listed in historical books dates back to year 22 Hijri (about 671  ad=Gregorian calendars) when Arab soldiers inter Aran or Alan region[1]. As it is believed before Islam era Alan's people were living in this area. Words such as Alania, Allan-Shahr, Alan-Shahr, and Alan-shah had been used firstly at the first ad century for this district where was located between Azerbaijan, Shirvan, Caspian sea, and Armenia. As it comes out from historical document many Alan people migrated from this area after Islamic era then firstly substitute by Muslim people from different ethnic groups such as Persians, Arabs, Turkmens, and Tatars. After that, the area between those four borders was known as Mugan or Amukan and other pronunciation of them.
The most historical place in the county is Barzand Castle that was the castle of Afshin who battled with Babak Khorramdin in an earlier century of Islamic history. People of this county are Shi'a Muslim and speak the Azeri language. The largest river of the county is Dareroud; it issues from southern and eastern foot of Sabalan and joins to Aras river on the northern border of Iran. This river is the largest internal river of the Ardabil Province.

The history of Germi city and county is intertwined with the history of Moghan region and settlements such as Barzand, Bajravan and Baz, as well as the history of Moghan and Shahsoon tribe. Unfortunately, most of the existing historical monuments of the city are not properly protected and as a result have been destroyed or smuggled out of the country. A small part of the historical monuments discovered from this city are kept in Kashan city museum and of course a small but important part of the discovered artifacts from it is kept in Copenhagen museum in Denmark. Some of these works are also kept in the National Museum of Iran.

The ancient hill (Aghamali Tappeh Si) is a valid document of the historical background of this city, which is located 9 km from the city and near the village (Shukurlu). Also, the first cloth in Hemmat hill, which was originally red and has a checkered background with a broken cross or the same as the sun or Mehr seal, woven in Iran, was discovered in Hemmat hill, Salala village (in Salaleh government correspondence) from Garmi city, which is now in the museum. National Iran is maintained. Recently, historical tombstones have been discovered in the protected cemetery of Alileh Moghan village (Germi). Alileh Cemetery should be considered one of the nationally registered monuments. The identified tombstones date back to 750 years ago. The altar and dome shape of these stones indicates that the tombstones have been installed on the tombs of religious and respected people. Also, Garmi city dates back to 250 BC and in the villages of Ramazanlu, Daryaman and Parmehr, works from the Parthian period have been discovered.

Geography 
Germi county is bordered by Bileh Savar and Parsabad cities from the north, Kalibar county (East Azerbaijan) from the west, Meshginshahr county from the south and the Republic of Azerbaijan from the east. Germi county is limited from the south to the foothills of Salavat mountains, from the north to Khorosloo mountains, from the west to Darreh River and from the east to Balharud.
The county's area is almost 1725 square kilometers. The  county altitude varies between 250 meters in the village of Khan Mohammad loo in the northwest up to 2200 meters in the khankandi Village in southWest which that Salavat Mountains are located there.  The Moghan (Germi) region, due to its specific topographic conditions, has a different climate with other parts of Azerbaijan and even its southern regions.Germi County has almost Mediterranean climate. Monsoon winds called Caspian Winds (Caspian Sea), which come from the Caspian Sea, greatly increase the cooling rate. The distance between the Moghan (Germi) region and the Caspian Sea is about 80 to 90 km, but in general, considering the climatic division, this region can be considered semi-arid because the annual rainfall is less than 500 mm. The warm summer heat It is wet and it has a moderate winter. The winters are usually accompanied by cold, frosty, and foggy winds. Average monthly temperature is of −1 to 31 °C (30 to 88 °F).

Geology
Many cold springs and beautiful natural landscapes are in Germi and around which attract tourists. The mineral springs of Germi (khan bulaghi, Zarana) are notable throughout Iran for their medicinal qualities.

Many beauty lakes: the largest of which are Gilarlul, are the habitats of some species of water birds. The beautiful Lake Gilarlu is located in an open area 03 km north-West of the city of Germi. It covers an area of 1.1 km2 and has an average depth of 1.5 metres. It is fed by Barzand rivers.

Climate 
Germi township in Ardebil Province is located between two low mountain ranges enjoying a warm climate in summers but pleasant and moderate weather in winter.
Germi, like most parts of Iran, has a semi-arid climate with fairly hot summers and relatively cold winters. The climate of Germi is moderate and mild to most of the districts and cities of Ardebil province.
The climate of this city, especially in the east, is somewhat influenced by the climate of the Caspian region and its collapse, and most of its settlements in the valleys are exposed by the rapid winds that are in some of the province's provinces such as Ardebil and Meshkinshahr. According to the 50 years precipitation statistics and records, The yearly average precipitation is 360 but annual precipitation varies between 200 up to 450; mm and an average monthly temperature varies from (-2.5 to 29.2 Celsius) allows farmers to reach good yields in growing cereals.
Germi also has a lot of winds, but it's not usually sparse. Local people have given them different names depending on the season, temperature, humidity, wind direction and wind power. Germi (the wind that is slowly and partly warm between the plains of the area and its mountains), the Gechi-Qiran (the wind that flows from the north and is very cold) and the promise (which can be called the Saba breeze) is the same as the wind near the spring And Nowruz is gentle and delusional) are famous winds of the region, all of which have a mild speed.

It is said that Mohammad Reza Shah Pahlavi, one of the army's ambassadors, was in charge of traveling to the region in 1956 and the establishment of the city of Moghan. On the trip that took place in the summer, the military commander's wife complained of hot weather in other cities of Moghan, but when Entering Germi, she was excited by the warm and elegant climate and insisted her husband that no city is more deserving of warmth than Moghan. Then the rumors of the local elders and the order of land and land came to the aid because, due to the order of the transactions and the unilateralism of the people, their land became more formal than before, and by following the elders and relying on this warm welcome, the owner of the bank's branch And the General Court had decided to finalize the report of the General to serve the king and mention the strategic and military advantages of the city of Germi and the conditions of that day of the Cold War and the Soviet Union, the state and the court to determine the city of Tabriz as the center of the city.

The average temperature peak in July is up to 31 °C, while the average minimum temperature in the winter season in February is reduced to a minus 1 °C. The maximum monthly average rainfall in November and May is 57 and 54 mm, respectively, and the minimum rainfall in July is 15 mm. The maximum monthly average of the days associated with the precipitation of the spring season in May May) is 13 days and the minimum is 5 days in the summer of July.

Germi Meteorological Station 
Germi Meteorological Station is a synoptic meteorological station located at Germi city of Ardabil province of Iran. It is one of the main international synoptic stations which has been established to provide meteorological services, climate risk management and crisis management in the city of Germi. This station has a significant role in the production of various bulletins to predict the weather in the northern region of Ardabil province. Germi Meteorology prepares and broadcasts various hourly daily reports on the status of atmospheric parameters.Germi Meteorology helps people, especially farmers in Germi city, as well as travelers and tourists, in guiding and informing the weather and weather forecast. Most of the information of Germi Meteorological Station will be published on the website of the Iran Meteorological Organization.

Germi city 
Germi city is the center of Germi county that is located 110 km north of Ardabil city.
Germi city is built in the middle of the valley on the Ojarud river bank. which is limited to Azna (1715 m) and Irnavash(1212 m) mountains from the south. Germi Neighboring on the Caspian Sea and the Republic of Azerbaijan, this city is of great political and economical significance.

This city is developed almost along Ardabil-Moghan road and Ojaroud river and its branches. It is a city with almost longitudinal texture. The body of city can be divided in to old and new parts. The old quarters of the city such as Moujereh, Yukhari Bash, Qaleh Bashi and Sarcheshmeh, Grand Mosque, Bazaar and Municipality are located in the old part of the city where the slope is high and most of the alleys and streets have a spiral path. The new part of the city includes newer neighborhoods such as the Red Crescent and Abish abad. In these places, the slope of the land is very gentle and the path of streets and alleys is straight and their width is large.

Also, after the landslide incident in Koutol neighborhood, some of the residents of the city were forced to move and settle in Valiasr town. The rivers of Germi Chai (Toulon River), Allah Darreh (in government correspondence "Allah Darq") and Coil Chai flow through the city of Germi. This rivers flows into the Caspian Sea.

The altitude of different parts of Garmi city is very different from the sea level and varies from 730 meters in the Red Crescent neighborhood to 1000 meters in Che Lak Yuli neighborhood. Important mountains around the city are: Azna, Qarakhan Daghi, Irnavash and Seyfar.

People and culture 

Germi is the capital of Germi County. According to the 2016, census, its population was 28,967, in 6,382 families.
The dominant majority of whom are ethnic Azeris. Notable for its shawl and carpet and ''short-napped coarse carpet" trade tradition. The ancient valuable Germi vestige and things are holds in Kashan museum, Iran National Museum, and Copenhagen museum. Germi county is also known as the seat of a World Heritage Site: the first piece of cloth woven in Iran and discovered in Salala Village were to be kept in Iran national museum.

Germi is an ancient city in the Ardabil province of Iran, thought to have been founded in the Parthian period.
Germi is located in an area known for temperate weather. It is an important agricultural center, the county seat of Germi County, and the capital of Moghan.

Demography 
 Population (Metropolitan): about 28,000
 Religion: Mainly Shi'a Islam
 Ethnicity: Mostly Azeri
 Language: The majority of the population speaks Azeri.

Religion 
The people of this city are Muslims and 100% of the Twelver Shiites and they pay special attention to religious ceremonies. Therefore, this city welcomes a number of famous praisers, poets, religious speakers every year, and especially in the days of Muharram, the rituals of recitation and taziyeh recitation. Which is held in villages and different parts of it, attracts a large audience from all over the country. Some special religious ceremonies, such as Chavosh Khan, sending pilgrims to the Sacred House of God, are still performed in this city. Mosques and group ceremonies in the mosque have a special place in the culture of the people of this region, so that on the first day of the New Year delivery, a visit is made to the mosque of each place and the residents try to participate in the ceremonies of all the neighborhoods they interact with. Visiting is ultimately simple and very easy were being  held.

Economy
The economy of Germi is partially Livestock and Agriculture, partially tourist based, with some industries in operation. Ghahraman water  Valve factory  the largest tap factory of its kind in the Middle East,is located in Germi.
Nearly 50% of the city's GDP is based on livestock and agriculture, and its red meat and livestock products, which are sent to all parts of the country, especially in metropolitan areas such as Tehran and Karaj, play an important role in people's livelihoods. Raising sheep, goats, cows, buffaloes and livestock is common.
After that, wheat production is very important in the city's economy. Cultivation, lentils, chickpeas, barley and alfalfa also have a significant share in the income of the people of the region.
Garmi has good products such as tomatoes, figs, walnuts, plums, cherries, pears and nectarines. However, except for the nectarine product, which has been developed and commercialized in recent years, other products are produced sparingly and non-commercially. .
In the 1370s, the city's honey production was also significant (nearly 400 tons per year), but in the last 15 years it has decreased to one tenth.
Some products such as ostrich, rice, canola, sunflower, corn, soybean, cotton, watermelon, melon, potato, cucumber, etc. are produced in a limited and scattered manner in the city.
Also, poultry production, especially turkey, is widely used in it, and this city is considered the poultry production base of Ardabil province, including turkeys. Buffalo breeding is also popular because of its dairy products.

Attractions 

The ancient town of Germi hopes to position itself as a top-tier tourist destination in a bid to attract more domestic and international visitors by renewing tourism infrastructure.The culturally-rich Germi and its surrounding lands have long been destinations for avid archaeology buffs and eco-travelers. Over the past couple of years, some seasons of excavation have been carried out in Germi and other villages nearby.

In November 2018, Iranian researchers discovered an Iron Age tomb in Germi, dating back to a time between 2500 and 3000 years ago, belonging to a child who was between 5 and 7 years old. It was unearthed in a survey aimed to probe the history of settlements in Yel Suyi, a ruined site majority of which is associated with the early Islamic era.

In December of the same year, several relics, dating back to Seljuk (1037–1194) and Il-Khanid (1256–1335/1353) eras, were unearthed in the vicinity of Alajouq fortress in Germi county.

Ardebil province is believed to be as old as the Achaemenid era (ca. 550–330 BC). Sources say that due to its proximity to the Caucasus, Ardabil was always vulnerable to invasions and attacks by the mountain peoples of the Caucasus as well as by the steppe dwellers of South Russia past the mountains.

During the Islamic conquest of Iran, Ardabil was the largest city in north-western Iran, ahead of Derbent, and remained so until the Mongol invasion period.
According to estimates, 8% of tourist attractions in Ardabil province are located in Garmi city.

Garmi is not a historical city or a modern city, so its attractions are more natural, but its special urban form, which is a combination of river, rock, mountain and plain, and the surrounding mountains and its special climate, especially in spring and autumn, are among the city's attractions. Irnavash Mountains - Safar and Azna are the natural symbols of this city.

In autumn, due to the rangeland of the region, the surrounding mountains become green again, and green and foggy autumn is one of the attractions of this city and county. Clouds that are trapped in the mountains and are available almost 100 days a year are among the natural attractions of this city.

The typical tourist area of Gilarlu Dam is located 7 km west of the city, whose lake with 8 million cubic meters of storage and 630 hectares is the largest lake in Ardabil province after Shurabil. This region is being developed and so far about 10 billion tomans of credit has been allocated to it.

Other hot spots are the villages of Moran district including Dashdibi, Afcheh, Omaslan, Salaleh, Tazeh Kando, Qara Yataq and the central part including the villages of Tang, Toulon, Khan Kennedy, Shokurlu, Gilarlu Dam and the villages of Ingut and Ini districts and Ini and Salala waterfalls. ... cited.

Accommodation and welfare facilities in this city are underdeveloped and only two guest houses are active in the city. Although in the tourism season, the facilities of some government institutions  are allocated to tourists, but still tourism accounts for only 1% of the population's income.

Sajichi food, milk pilaf with fish, doogh soup, keteh (a kind of local bread and vegetables), kheshil (local halim), qisi noodles, qiqnagh, qisawa, jigirtamaj, agardak (a kind of local sweets), triangles (a kind of local sweets), Cheese - local yogurt and buttermilk and of course kebabs and mutton by-products are satisfied by tourists and visitors.

and a few ancient bridges. In addition to these, in many villages of Germi, relics of ancient monuments, including tombs have been found.

Being a city of great antiquity, the origins of Germi go back 3000 to 6000 years (according to historical research in this city). This city was the capital of Germi county in different times, but its golden age was in the Parthian period.

Higher education

Payam Noor University of Germi
Islamic Azad University of Germi
Jame elmi Karbordi University of Germi
Islamic Azad University of ungut
Payam Noor University of Ungut

Gallery

See also 

 Khan kandi
 Tabriz
 Azerbaijan

References

External links 
 http://www.khankandi.blogfa.com/
 http://www.Tulun.ir
Wikimapia

Germi County

Cities in Ardabil Province

Populated places in Ardabil Province

Populated places in Germi County